Tedros is an Ethiopian and Eritrean name (cognate to Theodore) that may refer to
Given name
Tedros Adhanom Ghebreyesus (born 1965), Ethiopian politician and academic, director-general of the World Health Organization
Tedros Redae (born 1991), Ethiopian cyclist 
Tedros "Teddy" Teclebrhan (born 1983 in Eritrea), German comedian and actor

Surname
Abraham Tedros, Eritrean football player